Inje Speedium is a motor racing circuit in Inje County, South Korea, about  east of Seoul. The circuit is part of a larger complex, named the Inje Auto Theme Park, that includes a hotel and condominiums.

The track opened with a round of the Japanese Super Taikyu series on 25 May 2013, and held the opening round of the 2013 Asian Le Mans Series season on 4 August 2013.

The circuit was due to host the eighth round of the 2020 World Touring Car Cup on the 18th of October 2020. However, due to COVID-19 pandemic, the round was cancelled; and it would host the sixth round of 2021 World Touring Car Cup on 16–17 October 2021. But 2021 round was cancelled again due to the pandemic. And the round will be added again in the 2022 World Touring Car Cup calendar and cancelled for the third time due to quarantine restrictions.

Events

 Current

 July: Superrace Championship

 Former

 Asian Le Mans Series 3 Hours of Inje (2013–2014)
 Ferrari Challenge Asia–Pacific (2013–2014)
 Formula Masters China (2014)
 Super Taikyu (2013)
 TCR Korea (2018)

Lap records

The official race lap records at the Inje Speedium are listed as:

References

External links
 
Map and circuit history at RacingCircuits.info
Onboard lap of the circuit

Inje County
Motorsport venues in South Korea
Sports venues completed in 2013
2013 establishments in South Korea
Sports venues in Gangwon Province, South Korea